Sunshine Island, also known as Chau Kung To indigenously, is a companion island of Hei Ling Chau in Hong Kong. Located northeast of Hei Ling Chau and south of Peng Chau, the island was once the site of a drug addiction treatment centre. The island features scenic rocks and some abandoned buildings. It has only one inhabitant, a 78-year-old named Lam Chi-ngai, and there is no public transport to the island.

History
Friend (Quaker) Gus Borgeest, born in Ningbo in 1909, gave the island its English name and founded an audacious and successful resettlement and rehabilitation centre for Chinese refugees on Sunshine island in 1952. At the time opium addiction was endemic among many Chinese and the model farming community founded by Borgeest provided many mainland refugees and addicts in Hong Kong with a second chance. Borgeest's method was to provide land, housing, tools, seeds, training and assistance to refugees and give them the opportunity to each start a small farm on the island. The opportunity provided by Borgeest's project helped many refugee families re-establish themselves after the trauma of fleeing to Hong Kong. On a May 1956 visit to Sunshine Island one of the resettled refugees expressed the success of the project to then Hong Kong Governor Sir Alexander Grantham: "Sir, owning one's own land, managing one's own affairs, does something to a man. Such cannot be achieved, or even understood, by those who are content to let the government fill their rice bowls for them." For this work, Borgeest was awarded the 1961 Ramon Magsaysay Prize, also known colloquially as "Asia's Nobel Prize". The work of the Sunshine Island community was supported by The Religious Society of Friends (Quakers) in Hong Kong. Sunshine Island formed the basis of later drug rehabilitation settlements still existing in Hong Kong.

Fauna
After the construction of Hong Kong Disneyland, white-bellied sea eagles moved from their habitat in Pa Tau Kwu of Lantau Island to Sunshine Island. There is also an endemic species, the Bogadek's legless lizard (Dibamus bogadeki) living on the island.

See also

List of islands and peninsulas of Hong Kong
Outlying Islands

References

External links

 Gus Borgeest biography on Ramon Magsaysay Awards website
 Webpage about wildlife protection (WWF HK) on Sunshine Island
 Satellite image from Google Maps

Uninhabited islands of Hong Kong
Islands District
Islands of Hong Kong